The Église Saint-Louis is a historic Roman Catholic church in the 15th arrondissement of Marseille, France. It was designed in the Bauhaus architectural style by Jean-Louis Sourdeau, with additional sculptures designed by Carlo Sarrabezoles. Its construction was completed in 1935. It has been listed as an official historical monument since December 14, 1989.

References

Roman Catholic churches in Marseille
Roman Catholic churches completed in 1935
1935 establishments in France
Monuments historiques of Marseille
Bauhaus
20th-century Roman Catholic church buildings in France